Mazzia is an Italian surname. Notable people with the surname include:

Angelo Maria Mazzia (1823–1891), Italian painter
Bruno Mazzia (born 1941), Italian footballer and manager
Gonzalo Mazzia (born 1987), Argentine footballer
Valentino Mazzia (1922–1999), American physician

Italian-language surnames